Year 1080 (MLXXX) was a leap year starting on Wednesday (link will display the full calendar) of the Julian calendar.

Events 
 By place 

 Byzantine Empire 
 Autumn – Nikephoros Melissenos, a Byzantine general and aristocrat, seizes control of what remains of Byzantine Asia Minor (modern Turkey), and proclaims himself emperor against Nikephoros III. Melissenos makes an alliance with Sultan Suleiman ibn Qutulmish and recruits many Turkish mercenaries to his army.

 Europe 
 January 27 – Battle of Flarchheim: Emperor Henry IV defeats the forces led by the German anti-king Rudolf of Rheinfelden, duke of Swabia, near the town of Flarchheim (modern Germany). 
 April 17 – King Harald III dies after a 4-year reign and is buried at Dalby Church in Scania (modern Sweden). He is succeeded by his brother Canute IV (the Holy) as ruler of Denmark.
 October 14 – Battle on the Elster: Rudolf of Rheinfelden defeats the imperial forces led by Henry IV at the Elster River. Rudolf dies the following day at Merseburg of wounds received.

 Britain 
 May 14 – William Walcher, bishop of Durham, is killed by rebel Northumbrians. King William I (the Conqueror) sends a punitive expedition led by his half-brother Odo of Bayeux to pacify Northumbria.
 Autumn – Robert Curthose, a son of William I, is sent to invade Scotland. He reaches as far as Falkirk and forces King Malcolm III to agree to terms while building fortifications at Newcastle-on-Tyne.
 Osmund, bishop of Salisbury,  builds Devizes Castle in Wiltshire.

 Armenia 
 The Rubenid Principality of Cilicia gains independence after its founder, Ruben I, succeeds in establishing his authority in the mountainous regions of Cilicia.

 Africa 
 The Almoravid emir, Yusuf ibn Tashfin, conquers Tangier, Badis and Hunayn.

 China 
 Shen Kuo, Chinese polymath scientist and statesman, begins his defensive military campaign against the Tanguts of the Western Xia. He successfully defends the invasion route to Yanzhou (Shaanxi province).

 By topic 

 Religion 
 June 25 – Wibert of Ravenna is elected as anti-pope Clement III during the pro-imperial Synod of Brixen. Pope Gregory VII is deposed, signed in a decree by Henry IV.
 King Alfonso VI (the Brave) of León and Castile establishes Latin liturgy in the Catholic Church, in place of the Hispanic Rite.
 Benno II, bishop of Osnabrück, founds the Benedictine abby of Iburg Castle (modern Germany).

Births 
 Adelard of Bath, English philosopher (d. 1152)
 Adolf III, German count of Berg and Hövel (d. 1152)
 Alberic of Ostia, French cardinal-bishop (d. 1148)
 Barthélemy de Jur, French bishop (approximate date)
 Cellach of Armagh (or Celsus), Irish archbishop (d. 1129)
 Egas Moniz o Aio, Portuguese nobleman (d. 1146)
 Eilika of Saxony, German noblewoman (d. 1142)
 Ermesinde of Luxembourg, countess of Namur (d. 1143)
 Guarinus of Palestrina, Italian cardinal-bishop (d. 1158)
 Harald Kesja (the Spear), king of Denmark (d. 1135)
 Helie of Burgundy, countess of Toulouse (d. 1141)
 Henry I, archbishop of Mainz (approximate date)
 Honorius Augustodunensis, French theologian (d. 1154)
 Ibn Tumart, Almoravid political leader (approximate date)
 Leo I, prince of Cilician Armenia (approximate date)
 Lhachen Utpala, Indian king of Ladakh (d. 1110)
 Magnus Erlendsson, Norse earl of Orkney (d. 1115)
 María Rodríguez, countess of Barcelona (d. 1105)
 Matilda of Scotland, queen of England (d. 1118)
 Piotr Włostowic, Polish nobleman (approximate date)
 Reginald I (the One-Eyed), count of Bar (d. 1149)
 Richard Fitz Pons, Norman nobleman (d. 1129)
 Robert Pullen, English cardinal (approximate date)
 Rotrou III (the Great), French nobleman (d. 1144) 
 Theresa, Portuguese queen and regent (d. 1130)
 Wanyan Zonghan, Chinese nobleman (d. 1136)
 Wulfric of Haselbury, English wonderworker (d. 1154)

Deaths 
 January 26 – Amadeus II, count of Savoy (b. 1050)
 April 17 – Harald III, king of Denmark (b. 1040)
 May 14 – William Walcher, bishop of Durham
 July 5 – Ísleifur Gissurarson, Icelandic bishop (b. 1006)
 October 15 – Rudolf of Rheinfelden, duke of Swabia
 Abraham, bishop of St. David's (approximate date)
 Aristakes Lastivertsi, Armenian historian (b. 1002)
 Bertha of Blois, duchess of Brittany (approximate date)
 Haakon Ivarsson, Norwegian jarl (b. 1027)
 Lhachen Gyalpo, Indian king of Ladakh (b. 1050)
 Michael Attaleiates, Byzantine historian and writer
 Muhammad ibn Abbas, ruler of the Ghurid Dynasty

References